Paul J. McCurrie (March 27, 1929 – May 15, 2020) was an American lawyer and politician from New Jersey.

McCurrie was born in Kearny, and graduated in 1947 from Kearny High School. He served in the United States Navy and was commissioned an ensign. McCurrie received his law degree from Rutgers Law School and practiced law in Kearny, New Jersey. McCurrie served in the New Jersey General Assembly from 1962 to 1964 and was a Democrat.

McCurrie died of COVID-19 in Newark, on May 15, 2020, at age 91. His wife had also died from the disease 3 days earlier.

Notes

1929 births
2020 deaths
Kearny High School (New Jersey) alumni
People from Kearny, New Jersey
Politicians from Hudson County, New Jersey
Military personnel from New Jersey
Rutgers School of Law–Newark alumni
New Jersey lawyers
Democratic Party members of the New Jersey General Assembly
United States Navy officers
Deaths from the COVID-19 pandemic in New Jersey